Josh Cantrell is an American politician who has served as the Oklahoma House of Representatives member from the 49th district since November 16, 2022.

Early life and education
Josh Cantrell was raised in Kingston, Oklahoma where he graduate high school. He earned his associate's degree in 1995 from Murray State College and his bachelor's degree from East Central University.

Career
Cantrell worked in construction from 1999 to 2017.

Marshall County Commissioner
Cantrell was elected Marshall County Commissioner in 2017. He served until his election to the Oklahoma House of Representatives in 2022 when he resigned. After his resignation, Governor Kevin Stitt called a special election for the district to be held on February 14, 2023.

Oklahoma House of Representatives
Cantrell declared his candidacy for Oklahoma House of Representatives 49th district in 2022 to succeed term-limited Representative Tommy Hardin. He faced Richard Miller in the Republican primary. He won the primary and since no non-Republican candidate filed for the race, there was no November general election. He was sworn in November 16, 2022.

Personal life
He is married to his wife Tanya and they have two sons together.

References

21st-century American politicians
County commissioners in Oklahoma
Living people
Republican Party members of the Oklahoma House of Representatives
Year of birth missing (living people)